Naranjal is a district of the Alto Paraná Department, Paraguay.

The mayor of Narajal elected in 2015 is Edoard Schaffrath.

The population is 13,000, most of whom work in agriculture in small farms situated in Narajanl, San Alfredo and Aurora II. 
Naranjal was colonized by Brazilian immigrants, and the majority of the people living at Narajal today retain Brazilian culture and language (Portuguese).
The main activity for its people is agriculture, cultivating soybeans, corn and wheat. There are a number of small family owned stores, a few supermarkets, a couple of drugstores and restaurants.

Considered a safe place to live by its inhabitants, people know each other by family name and mingle together at local festivities such as Fiesta de la Costilla, which is an event where more than 5000 people attend to eat ribs cooked over a period of 12 hours.